Amman East Power Plant is a combined cycle gas-fired power plant in Al Manakher, Jordan.  It was the first independent power plant in Jordan.

The plant is operated by AES Jordan PSC, a subsidiary of AES Corporation and Mitsui & Co.  Construction started in 2007 and the plant was commissioned in 2009.  The plant has an installed capacity of 380 MW and it cost US$300 million.

In 2011, it was announced that Qatar Electricity & Water Corporation will buy a stake in the power plant.

References

Natural gas-fired power stations in Jordan